Caprellinoides is a genus of  amphipods (commonly known as skeleton shrimps) in the family Caprellidae.

References 

 Guerra - Garcia J.M. (2001c). A new species of Caprellinoides (Crustacea: Amphipoda: Phtisicidae) from the Antarctic. Helgoländer Meeresuntersuchungen, 55, pp. 212–220

External links 
 

 
 Caprellinoides at the World Register of Marine Species (WoRMS)

Corophiidea
Malacostraca genera